Saughall Massie is a village in Wirral, Merseyside, England.  It contains six buildings that are recorded in the National Heritage List for England as designated listed buildings, all of which are listed at Grade II.   This grade is the lowest of the three gradings given to listed buildings and is applied to "buildings of national importance and special interest".  The listed buildings comprise four houses, an outbuilding, and a bridge.

References

Citations

Sources

Listed buildings in Merseyside
Lists of listed buildings in Merseyside